Bastheim is a municipality in the district of Rhön-Grabfeld in Bavaria in Germany. Wechterswinkel Abbey stands in the village of Wechterswinkel, part of Bastheim.

References

Rhön-Grabfeld